This Is the Night may refer to:

Film
 This Is the Night (1932 film), an American pre-Code comedy film, Cary Grant's feature film debut
 This Is the Night (2021 film), an American drama film

Music
 "This Is the Night", fourth track on The The's 1993 album Dusk
 "This Is the Night" (Clay Aiken song), 2003
 "This Is the Night", fifteenth track, recorded (unknown date) by Jeri Lynne Fraser, on the 2007 compilation album Rebel Without a Cause
 "This Is the Night" (Kurt Calleja song), 2012

See also
This Is Your Night